Ilya Alekseyevich Molteninov (born 15 December 1995) is a Russian football player who plays for FC Ufa.

Club career
He made his debut in the Russian Football National League for FC Chertanovo Moscow on 8 August 2020 in a game against FC Tom Tomsk, as a starter.

References

External links
 
 Profile by Russian Football National League
 

1995 births
Footballers from Moscow
Living people
Russian footballers
Association football forwards
FC Chertanovo Moscow players
FC Metallurg Lipetsk players
FC Salyut Belgorod players
FC Veles Moscow players
FC Yenisey Krasnoyarsk players
FC Ufa players
Russian First League players
Russian Second League players